Mount Lyndon is a mountain in the Southern Alps of the Canterbury region of New Zealand's South Island.

References

Mountains of Canterbury, New Zealand
Southern Alps